The Ngolibardu, otherwise written, Ngulipartu, were an Aboriginal Australian people of Western Australia.

Country
They were on the Rudall River, whose waters at Kalamilji  were a final refuge in times of extreme drought. From the Rudall their land ran north as far as the Paterson Range. Their eastern frontier lay at Mount Broadhurst Range and Rooney Creek, while their western boundary was marked by the Throssell Range. These tribal lands were later taken over by the Kartudjara, moving up from the south, and the westward movement of the Nyangumarta to their north. On their western flank were the Wanman, and to their east lay the Nyamal.

History
Traditions hold that the Ngolibardu's numbers were diminishing even before the period of contact with white colonialists. Apparently, the tribe was struck by a devastating "fever" sometime around the turn of the 19th-20th centuries, which killed off large numbers of their community, to the point of virtual extinction.

Alternative names
 Tjilakurukuru (regional name for their country)

Notes

Citations

Sources

Aboriginal peoples of Western Australia
Canning Stock Route
Mid West (Western Australia)